Robert of Rouen may refer to:

Robert II (archbishop of Rouen) (died 1037)
Robert, Bishop of Lydda and Ramla (died bef. 1112)

See also
Robert of Normandy (disambiguation)